Old Trap is an unincorporated community in Spotsylvania County, in the U.S. state of Virginia.
Old Trap has an elevation of 289 feet.

References

Unincorporated communities in Virginia
Unincorporated communities in Spotsylvania County, Virginia